Beaurepaire is a commune in the Isère department in southeastern France.

Population

History
Beaurepaire was the first town in France to be fitted with electric lanterns.

Sports
It is well known to rugby enthusiasts for its first division team, and its affiliation with ex-internationals Marc Cécillon and Olivier Milloud.

Amenities
Beaurepaire has a cinema and a stadium, as well as a train station (which has been in disuse since at least the early 2000s (decade) ).

Twin towns
Beaurepaire is twinned with:

  Auenwald, Germany, since 1987

See also
Communes of the Isère department

References

Communes of Isère
Isère communes articles needing translation from French Wikipedia
Dauphiné